Amaele Abbiati (18 January 1925 – 5 January 2016) was an Italian politician who served as Mayor of Alessandria from 1964 to 1967 and as Deputy (1968–1972).

References

1925 births
2016 deaths
Mayors of Alessandria
Deputies of Legislature V of Italy
20th-century Italian politicians
Italian Socialist Party politicians